Tom Scholte is a Canadian actor and academic. He is most noted for his performances in the film Last Wedding, for which he was a Genie Award nominee for Best Supporting Actor at the 22nd Genie Awards in 2002 and a Vancouver Film Critics Circle nominee for Best Actor in a Canadian Film at the Vancouver Film Critics Circle Awards 2001, and The Dick Knost Show, for which he received a Vancouver Film Critics Circle nomination for Best Actor in a Canadian Film at the Vancouver Film Critics Circle Awards 2013.

He has also appeared in the films Live Bait, Goldrush: A Real Life Alaskan Adventure, No More Monkeys Jumpin' on the Bed, Lunch with Charles, Moving Malcolm, See Grace Fly, Fathers & Sons, Sisters & Brothers and Kingsway, and the television series The X-Files, Da Vinci's Inquest, and Cold Squad.

He was a cofounder of the Neworld Theatre Company in Vancouver, British Columbia, is a two-time Jessie Richardson Award nominee for his stage performances, and is a professor in the department of theatre and film at the University of British Columbia.

Scholte's academic work is in the intersection of theatre studies and cybernetics. In 2021, Scholte became Vice-President of the American Society for Cybernetics (ASC) Scholte is a presenter on the 'Systems and Cybernetics' podcast of the New Books Network.

Contributions to cybernetics
Scholte's contributions to cybernetics have focused on the role of the creative arts with cybernetics and developing cybernetics' critical possibilities.

Scholte co-hosted the 2019 ASC conference 'Acting Cybernetically'.

Filmography

Film

Television

References

External links

20th-century Canadian male actors
21st-century Canadian male actors
Canadian male film actors
Canadian male television actors
Canadian male stage actors
Cyberneticists
Male actors from Vancouver
Academic staff of the University of British Columbia
Living people
Year of birth missing (living people)